Ogema, derived from the Anishinaabemowin word ogimaa meaning "chief", may refer to:

Ogema, Minnesota, a city in Becker County, Minnesota, United States
Ogema, Wisconsin, a town in Price County, Wisconsin, United States
Ogema (community), Wisconsin, an unincorporated community in Price County, Wisconsin, United States
Ogema Township, Minnesota, a township in Pine County, Minnesota, United States
Ogema, Saskatchewan, a town in Saskatchewan, Canada (named by switching the positions of the consonants in "Omega"—the town was at the end of the rail line, but another town was already called Omega)

See also
John Okemos
Ogemaw
 Sachem, cognate word meaning "chief"